Pavel Alehavich Mialeshka (born 24 November 1992) is a Belarusian track and field athlete competing in the javelin throw. In 2019, he competed in the men's javelin throw at the 2019 World Athletics Championships in Doha, Qatar. He did not qualify to compete in the final. He also competed in the men's javelin throw at the 2017 World Championships in Athletics held in London, United Kingdom. In this competition he also did not qualify to compete in the final.

In 2018, he competed in the men's javelin throw at the 2018 European Athletics Championships held in Berlin, Germany.

He competed in the men's javelin throw event at the 2020 Summer Olympics held in Tokyo, Japan.

References

External links 

 

Living people
1992 births
Place of birth missing (living people)
Belarusian male javelin throwers
World Athletics Championships athletes for Belarus
Athletes (track and field) at the 2020 Summer Olympics
Olympic athletes of Belarus
Olympic male javelin throwers